Janauaria is a fungal genus  in the family Agaricaceae. This is a monotypic genus, containing the single species Janauaria amazonica, found in Brazil and described as new to science in 1986 by mycologist Rolf Singer.

See also
 List of Agaricaceae genera
 List of Agaricales genera

References

Agaricaceae
Fungi of South America
Monotypic Agaricales genera
Taxa named by Rolf Singer